Stanisław Srokowski (born 29 June 1936 in Hnilcze) is a Polish writer, poet, dramatist, literary critic, translator, academic teacher and publicist.

Life
He was born on 29 June 1936 in Hnilcze (Ukrainian: Гнильче). In 1945, after the expulsion from the Eastern Borderlands, he and his family settled in Mieszkowice, Western Poland.
He graduated from high school in 1955. He was subsequently expelled from the Higher School of Diplomatic Service on the grounds of his church attendance and the refusal to join the Polish United Workers' Party (PZPR), the Communist party which governed the Polish People's Republic. Between 1955-56, he worked as a teacher in Zielin.

He made his literary debut in 1958 in Opole. In 1960, he graduated in Polish philology from the University of Opole. In the years 1960-68, he worked as a high school teacher in Legnica. After the 1968 Polish political crisis, known as the March events, he was forced to leave his post as a teacher. Between 1970-81, he worked as a journalist of the Wiadomości magazine. He then worked as press secretary of Solidarity and was also a member of the Fighting Solidarity organization. Between 1990-93, he lectured at the University of Wrocław. He has been a member of the Polish Writers' Union (ZLP), Polish Society of Authors and Composers and the Polish Translators' Society.

He is known for his short story Nienawiść (Hatred, 2006) as well as novels Ukraiński kochanek (Ukrainian Lover, 2008) and Zdrada (Betrayal, 2009) in which he deals with the subject of the Volhynian Genocide perpetrated by Ukrainian nationalists on the Polish population of Volhynia in 1943. In 2016, Polish filmmaker Wojciech Smarzowski directed an award-winning film Volhynia based on Srokowski's 2006 short story Hatred.

Works

Poetry
Ścięte ptaki, Wydawnictwo Literackie, Kraków 1967
Rysy, Ossolineum, Wrocław 1968
Strefa ciszy (The Silence Zone), Czytelnik, Warszawa 1968
Akty (Acts), Wydawnictwo Literackie, 1971
Ty (You), Czytelnik, 1971
Ptaki nocy, ptaki miłości (Birds of Night, Birds of Love), Ossolineum, 1978
Cztery pory domu, Ossolineum, 1980
Świadectwo urodzenia (Birth Certificate), Ossolineum, 1981
Zjadanie, Państwowy Instytut Wydawniczy, 1985
Miłość i śmierć (Love and Death), Światowit Izba Wydawnicza (2005)
Liryki, Światowit Izba Wydawnicza (2009)

Novels
Przyjść, aby wołać, Ossolineum, 1976
Fatum, Ossolineum, 1977
Lęk (Fear), Ossolineum, 1978 (wydanie II, 1988, wydanie III 1997)
Nieobecny, Czytelnik, 1978
Wtajemniczenie, Ossolineum 1981
Sen Belzebuba (Beelzebub's Dream), Ossolineum, 1982
Duchy dzieciństwa (Ghosts of Childhood), Ludowa Spółdzielnia Wydawnicza, 1985
Repatrianci, Czytelnik, 1988, 1989
Chrobaczki, Ludowa Spółdzielnia Wydawnicza, 1989
Płonący motyl (The Burning Butterfly), Państwowy Instytut Wydawniczy, 1989
Ladacznica i chłopcy, Wydawnictwo Rubikon, 1991
Gry miłosne (Love Games), Wydawnictwo Zysk i S-ka, 1997
Czas diabła (Time of the Devil), Wydawnictwo Zysk i S-ka, 1999
Anioł Zagłady (Angel of Destruction), Wydawnictwo Zysk i S-ka, 2000
Ukraiński kochanek (Ukrainian Lover), Volume 1 of Saga Kresowa, Wydawnictwo Arcana, 2008
Zdrada (Betrayal), Volume 2 of Saga Kresowa, Wydawnictwo Arcana, 2009
Ślepcy idą do nieba (The Blind Go to Heaven), Volume 3 of Saga Kresowa, Arcana, 2011
Barbarzyńcy u bram (Barbarians at the Gates), Arcana, 2012
Spisek barbarzyńców, 2 Kolory, 2015
Barbarzyńcy w salonie, Arcana 2017

Short stories
Walka kogutów (Fight of the Roosters), Wydawnictwo „Śląsk”, 1981, 
Nienawiść, Prószyński i S-ka, 2006, 
Strach. Opowiadania kresowe, Fronda, 2014,

Biography books
Skandalista Wojaczek, Izba Wydawnicza Światowit , 1999

Documentary books
Hnilcze, Izba Wydawnicza Światowit, 2013
Życie wśród pisarzy, agentów i intryg (Life Among Writers, Agents and Intrigues), Magna Polonia, 2018

Plays
Gałązka jaśminu, Aktorka, Cienie, Ściana, Drzwi, Dwoje, Dziadek collected in publication Drzwi, Ossolineum, 1979

Screenplay
Przeklęta ziemia (Cursed Land), directed by Ryszard Czekała, 1988
Basis for Volhynia, directed by Wojciech Smarzowski, 2017

Children's books
Bajki Ezopa, Wydawnictwo Volumen, 1991
Ośle uszy króla Midasa, Izba Wydawnicza Światowit, 1992
Zające i żaby (Hares and Frogs), Wydawnictwo Światowit, 1992
Mity greckie (Greek Myths), Wydawnictwo Światowit, 1993, 1994, 1995
Przygody Odyseusza, Wydawnictwo Światowit, 1994, 1995
Wojna trojańska (Trojan War), Wydawnictwo Światowit, 1994
Przygody Heraklesa (Hercules's Adventures), Wydawnictwo Światowit, 1996

See also
Polish literature
Nike Award

References

Living people
1936 births
Polish novelists
Polish poets
Polish journalists
Polish children's writers
People from Ternopil Oblast